The 1997 Kerry Senior Football Championship was the 97th staging of the Kerry Senior Football Championship since its establishment by the Kerry County Board in 1889. The draw for the opening round fixtures took place on 27 February 1997. The championship ran from 24 July to 2 November 1997.

Laune Rangers entered the championship as the defending champions.

The final was played on 2 November 1997 at Austin Stack Park in Tralee, between East Kerry and Laune Rangers, in what was their first ever meeting in the final. East Kerry won the match by 1-11 to 0-08 to claim their fifth championship title overall and a first title in 27 years.

East Kerry's Paud O'Donoghue was the championship's top scorer with 1-32.

Results

Round 1

Quarter-finals

Semi-finals

Final

Championship statistics

Top scorers

Overall

In a single game

Miscellaneous

 East Kerry win the title for the first time in 27 years.
 The final goes to a replay for the first time since 1994.

References

Kerry Senior Football Championship
1997 in Gaelic football